Megosmidus tuberculatus is a species of beetle in the family Cerambycidae, the only species in the genus Megosmidus.

References

Hesperophanini